The Associated Press College Basketball Coach of the Year award was established in 1967 to recognize the best men's college basketball coach of the year, as voted upon by the Associated Press (AP). A parallel award for women's coaches was added in 1995. The 2011 women's award, shared by three coaches, was notable as the first shared AP award in any college sport.

John Wooden of UCLA and Bob Knight of Indiana have won the most awards on the men's side with five and three, respectively. Among active men's coaches only Tony Bennett of Virginia (and Washington State) and Bill Self of Kansas have won the award more than once; both of them winning the award twice and at both programs they have coached. Geno Auriemma of Connecticut has by far the most awards, with nine on the women's side, followed by Muffet McGraw of Notre Dame with four. Tom and Keno Davis are the only father-and-son duo to win the award.

Winners
Schools are referred to in these listings by their current athletic brand names, even though they may not be historically accurate for the season of a given award. The only school affected by this is UConn, which used "Connecticut" as its official athletic brand before 2013–14 (although it widely used "UConn" before then).

Men's

Key

Women's

See also
Associated Press College Basketball Player of the Year (men)
Associated Press Women's College Basketball Player of the Year

References

External links

Awards established in 1967
Awards established in 1995
College basketball coach of the year awards in the United States
Associated Press awards